Ihala Medagama Piyasena Gamage (born 10 January 1949) is a Sri Lankan politician, a member of the Parliament of Sri Lanka and a government minister. He has been in parliament 1994, 2000, 2001, 2004, and 2010 from Galle district.

See also
 Cabinet of Sri Lanka

References
 

Sri Lankan Buddhists
Living people
1949 births
Members of the 9th Parliament of Sri Lanka
Members of the 10th Parliament of Sri Lanka
Members of the 11th Parliament of Sri Lanka
Members of the 12th Parliament of Sri Lanka
Members of the 13th Parliament of Sri Lanka
Members of the 14th Parliament of Sri Lanka
Government ministers of Sri Lanka
Sri Lanka Freedom Party politicians
United People's Freedom Alliance politicians
Members of the 15th Parliament of Sri Lanka